Axiopoeniella is a genus of moths in the subfamily Arctiinae. The genus was described by Strand in 1909.

Species
Axiopoeniella laymerisa (Grandidier, 1867)
Axiopoeniella octocentra Vári, 1964

References

External links

Arctiinae
Moth genera